Seán Hillen (born 1961, in Ireland is an artist whose work includes collages and the creative use of photographs.

Early life
Hillen was raised in Newry, County Down, Northern Ireland in 1961. He studied at the Belfast College of Art. In 1982, he travelled to London to continue his studies at the London College of Printing, and then at the Slade School of Fine Art.

Early work
Hillen traveled back and forth between Northern Ireland and England over the course of several years. He photographed scenes related to the conflict in Northern Ireland. He later incorporated these photographs into photomontage work. Eventually, he began to take photographs with the photomontage as his priority.

In 2011 the National Library of Ireland Photographic Archive acquired those c.700 photographs from Hillen which will be held permanently as The Seán Hillen Collection, in posterity. They were exhibited in 2012 at the Photographic Archive and 17,000 people attended. 
The photos were acquired as 35mm negatives and high-resolution scans.

Many of these photomontages have lengthy, comical titles such as “Sr. Faustina Appears In London Newry, Miraculously Preventing The Illegal Photography Of Members Of The Security Forces...”.   His works on Northern Ireland were published, appearing on the covers of Creative Camera and the Royal Photographic Journal. Taking photos of the Security Forces was, and is, technically illegal. Hillen often pretended to be part of the press or “just an innocent art student”.

Irelantis
In 1993, Hillen returned to Ireland. Between 1994 and 1997, he created a new body of work entitled Irelantis. The Irelantis series is a collection of scalpel-and-glue collages. They are a bizarre hybrid of the everyday postcard visuals, mixed with a fantastical other world. Most of these highly decorative collages, showing landmarks from around Ireland, are no bigger than a postcard.

These works are partly influenced by the famous picture postcards of John Hinde. Hillen adapts these nostalgic images, juxtaposing the familiar touristic shots to create an altogether different and complex image. The Irelantis series celebrates the imagery of Ireland. Hillen illustrates places such as the Cliffs of Moher, Newgrange, Trinity College and  O'Connell Street.

Other works
Hillen has worked in other media and art forms, including sculpture, video, illustration, performance, stage and graphic design. His later activities include photo series such as the ongoing Untitled Broken Umbrella Project, which consists of hundreds of photos of broken umbrellas around Dublin.

In 2007 Hillen won, with landscape architect Desmond Fitzgerald, the design competition for an Omagh bomb Memorial. He lives and works in Dublin.

His works are held in many public and private collections including the Irish State Collection, the Imperial War Museum, the European Central Bank, the Irish Central Bank, Citigroup, the BBC and Microsoft.

References

External links
 Sean Hillen's homepage
 "Tomorrow is Saturday" - documentary on RTÉ about Sean Hillen's personal and professional life
 Video of The View, RTÉ website; accessed 9 December 2016. 
 Seán Hillen profile, 3declic.net; accessed 9 December 2016.
 "Melancholy Witness: Images of the Troubles" (by Seán Hillen), irishtimes.com; accessed 9 December 2016.

20th-century male artists from Northern Ireland
21st-century male artists from Northern Ireland
Alumni of the Slade School of Fine Art
1961 births
Living people
Alumni of Ulster University
20th-century Irish male artists